The 2021 Almaty Challenger was a professional tennis tournament played on clay courts. It was the fifth edition of the tournament which was part of the 2021 ATP Challenger Tour. It took place in Almaty, Kazakhstan between 7 and 13 June 2021.

Singles main draw entrants

Seeds

 1 Rankings are as of 31 May 2021.

Other entrants
The following players received entry into the singles main draw as wildcards:
  Timofey Skatov
  Denis Yevseyev
  Beibit Zhukayev

The following player received entry into the singles main draw as an alternate:
  Roberto Ortega Olmedo

The following players received entry from the qualifying draw:
  Evan Furness
  Filip Jianu
  Vladyslav Orlov
  Vitaliy Sachko

Champions

Singles

 Zizou Bergs def.  Timofey Skatov 4–6, 6–3, 6–2.

Doubles

  Jesper de Jong /  Vitaliy Sachko def.  Vladyslav Manafov /  Evgenii Tiurnev 7–6(7–4), 6–1.

References

Almaty Challenger
2021 in Kazakhstani sport
June 2021 sports events in Asia